Jeffrey "Jeff" Simon (born August 17, 1989) is an American short track speed skater and three-time bronze medallist at the World Championships.

At the 2011 World Short Track Speed Skating Championships in Sheffield, England, Simon won three bronze medals.  In his first event, Simon won a bronze medal in the men's 1500 m, finishing behind Noh Jin-Kyu and Charles Hamelin. Simon won his second bronze in the men's 3000 m, finishing behind Noh Jin-Kyu and Liang Wenhao. In his last event, the men's 5000 m relay, Simon won the bronze with Kyle Carr, Travis Jayner, and Anthony Lobello. Simon also competed in the men's 500 and 1000 m but did not advance to the finals in either event.

References

External links
 Jeff Simon's profile, from the International Skating Union.
 Jeff Simon's profile, from ShorttrackOnLine.info.

1989 births
Living people
American male short track speed skaters